Floronia is a genus of spiders in the family Linyphiidae first described by Eugène Simon in 1887.

Species
, it contains 6 species:

Floronia annulipes Berland, 1913
Floronia bucculenta (Clerck, 1757)
Floronia exornata (L. Koch, 1878)
Floronia hunanensis Li & Song, 1993
Floronia jiuhuensis Li & Zhu, 1987
Floronia zhejiangensis Zhu, Chen & Sha, 1987

References

Linyphiidae
Araneomorphae genera
Spiders of Europe
Spiders of Asia
Spiders of South America